Crime Scene is the second full-length album by the theatrical metal band Dakrya. It is a concept album focusing on society.

Track listing 

 "The Charlatans" - 4:32
 "Blind Man's Bluff" - 5:05
 "Scaremongering" - 4:35
 "The Urban Tribe" - 3:59
 "Camouflage" - 4:34
 "Phantasmagoria" - 4:51
 "Inertia" - 4:24
 "Dramatis Personae" - 6:07
 "A Dreadful Sidescene" - 2:27

Personnel

Band members 
 Thomais Chatzigianni - Vocals
 Christina Kalantzi - Vocals
 Angelos Charogiannis - Guitars
 George Droulias - Guitars & Backing Vocals
 Sophia Charalampous - Keyboards
 Alex Drake - Bass
 Stavros Vorisis - Drums

Production 
 Pelle Saether - Mixing
 Goran Finnberg - Mastering
 George Bokos - Sound Engineering

Additional musicians 
 Costas Triantafillou - Saxophone (on "Camouflage")

References 

2010 albums
Dakrya albums